Kim Gevaert (born 5 August 1978 in Leuven) is a former sprint athlete and Olympic champion from Belgium.

Career
Her closest brush with a world title came in running 4/100 of a second behind three-time champion Gail Devers at the 2004 IAAF World Indoor Championships in Athletics. At the next World Indoor Championships, in 2006, she won the bronze medal in a national record time of 7.11 seconds.

On 9 August 2006 Gevaert won the 100 metres at the European Championships in 11.06 seconds. Two days later, she also won the final of the 200 metres, which was celebrated together with fellow Belgian athlete Tia Hellebaut, who had won gold in the high jump final only minutes before Kim Gevaert. With her first medal, Gevaert became the first Belgian gold medalist at the European Championships in 35 years and the first woman to win the sprint double since 1994.

At the 2007 World Championships she won a bronze medal in the 4 × 100 metres relay, together with teammates Hanna Mariën, Olivia Borlée and Élodie Ouédraogo. With 42.75 seconds the team set a new Belgian record. A few days earlier as best European athlete she had finished 5th in a thrilling 100 m final.

On her 30th birthday, three days before the opening of the 2008 Summer Olympics in Beijing, Gevaert announced that she would retire at the end of the 2008 season.

At the 2008 Summer Olympics, Gevaert was in the best condition of her life. She reached the 100 m semifinals by ending 3rd in her quarterfinals, but after missing her start she finished sixth and failed to proceed to the finals. In the finals of the 4×100 m for women a couple of days later, Gevaert ran the final leg for the Belgian team and finished in second behind the Russians to bring home the silver medal in a new Belgian record of 42.54 seconds. On 16 August 2016, it was announced that the IOC had officially disqualified the Russian 4 x 100 metres relay team after Yuliya Chermoshanskaya's re-tested samples revealed two illegal substances, awarding the gold medal to the Belgian team.  She was awarded the gold medal eight years late on September 10, 2016.

On 5 September 2008, Kim Gevaert ended her career running the 100 m at the Memorial Van Damme in Brussels, Belgium, a race which she won in 11.25.

Personal life
Gevaert has two brothers, Marlon and John, and a sister Sigrid. Marlon competed in sprint at the national level in Belgium before becoming a national sprint coach in New Zealand. In 2010 Gevaert married her long-time partner and a fellow athlete Djeke Mambo. They have two sons and one daughter, who are bilingual, as the principal language of their father is French and of their mother is Flemish.

Honours 
 2009 : Dame Grand Cross of the Order of the Crown, by Royal Decree of H.M. King Albert II.

Major achievements

Personal best
60 metres: 7.10 seconds (Belgian Record) 
100 metres: 11.04 seconds (Wind: 2.0/Place: Brussels/Date:09 07 2006) (Belgian Record) 
200 metres: 22.20 seconds (Brussels/09 07 2006) (Belgian Record) 
400 metres: 51.45 seconds (-/Gent/08 05 2005) (Belgian Record)

References

External links

Profile: Kim Gevaert All-Athletics.com
 Kim Gevaert's website

1978 births
Living people
Belgian female sprinters
Olympic athletes of Belgium
Athletes (track and field) at the 2004 Summer Olympics
Athletes (track and field) at the 2008 Summer Olympics
Olympic gold medalists for Belgium
World Athletics Championships athletes for Belgium
Sportspeople from Leuven

Grand Crosses of the Order of the Crown (Belgium)
World Athletics Championships medalists
KU Leuven alumni
European Athletics Championships medalists
Medalists at the 2008 Summer Olympics
Olympic gold medalists in athletics (track and field)
World Athletics Indoor Championships medalists
Universiade medalists in athletics (track and field)
Universiade gold medalists for Belgium
Universiade silver medalists for Belgium
Medalists at the 1999 Summer Universiade
Medalists at the 2001 Summer Universiade
Olympic female sprinters